Chrysosphaerales is an order of Chrysophyceae.

References

Heterokont orders
Chrysophyceae